Mark Holmes may refer to:

 Mark V. Holmes (born 1960), United States judge
 Mark Holmes (filmmaker) (born 1968), filmmaker and part owner of Daisy 3 Pictures
 Mark Holmes (canoeist) (born 1964), Canadian sprint canoer
 Mark H. Holmes (born 1950), American applied mathematician
 Mark Holmes (musician) (born 1960), vocalist and bassist for the Canadian new wave band Platinum Blonde
 Mark Holmes, writer for the Christian-based television series Gerbert
 Mark Holmes, member of the Los Angeles band Bleed the Dream